Geeta Bharat Jain (born 5 July 1964) is an Indian politician belonging to Bharatiya Janata Party (BJP) originally but fought election as an independent candidate due to internal rivalry in BJP and won election. She afterwards gave support to Shiv Sena led MVA Govt. After 1 year, she joined Shiv Sena in presence of Chief Minister Uddhav Thackeray. She is member of the 14th Maharashtra Legislative Assembly from Mira Bhayandar constituency. She had served as a Mayor of the city of Mira-Bhayandar from February 2015 to August 2017. After increasing internal conflicts in Shiv Sena, on 22 June 2022 she joined the BJP again.

Early life and education 
Geeta was born in Mumbai and raised in the Mumbai suburb Andheri. Geeta Jain graduated from PVT Polytechnic College, Mumbai with the Diploma of Medical Laboratory Technology in 1984.
Geeta was raised as an elder sister among three siblings. Her father used to run a small retail shop of cloths at Jogeshwari.

After completing her schooling at M.A. high school, Andheri, she completed her higher secondary studies at Bhavans College, Mumbai. Geeta also went to PVT Polytechnic College, Santacruz, Mumbai to pursue the Diploma of Medical Laboratory Technology (D.M.L.T.)

In August 1984 Geeta married Bharat Jain. They have two daughters.

Positions held
 2002: Elected as corporator in Mira-Bhayandar Municipal Corporation (1st term)
 2012: Re-Elected as corporator in Mira-Bhayandar Municipal Corporation (2nd term)
 2015: Elected as mayor of Mira-Bhayandar Municipal Corporation
 2017: Re-Elected as corporator in Mira-Bhayandar Municipal Corporation (3rd term)
 2019: Elected as member of Maharashtra Legislative Assembly from Mira Bhayandar

See also
 Uddhav Thackeray ministry

References

External links
 Shivsena official website

Bharatiya Janata Party politicians from Maharashtra
Living people
Maharashtra politicians
1964 births
Members of the Maharashtra Legislative Assembly